Bury Me Deep in Love is a single released by Australian rock group The Triffids from their album Calenture. It appeared in October 1987 and reached No. 48 on the Australian Kent Music Report Singles Chart. It was produced by Gil Norton (Pixies, Echo & the Bunnymen, Foo Fighters) and written by David McComb, the group's lead singer and guitarist. The B-sides "Baby Can I Walk You Home" and "Region Unknown" were produced by Victor Van Vugt and The Triffids. The single was released as 7", 12" & CD single versions.

"Bury Me Deep in Love" was covered by Kylie Minogue, in a duet with Jimmy Little, on the 2001 album Corroboration. It was used in the Australian TV soap Neighbours for the wedding of Harold Bishop and Madge Mitchell. The single was re-issued in the United Kingdom in August 1989 (again as a 7", 12" & CD version), with new B-sides to tie in with the local broadcast of the Neighbours 1989 episode. The new tracks were cover versions of "Rent" by Pet Shop Boys and "Into the Groove" by Madonna. It was also used in November 2009 for Australian drama series, Packed to the Rafters for the wedding of Ben and Mel.

Track listing

Original release
"Bury Me Deep in Love" (7", 12", CD)
"Baby Can I Walk You Home" (7", 12", CD)
"Region Unknown" (12", CD)
"Vagabond Holes" (CD)

1989 UK re-issue
"Bury Me Deep in Love" (7", 12", CD) – 4:02
"Rent" (7", 12", CD) – 2:43
"Into the Groove" (12", CD) – 4:25

Charts

Personnel
Credited to:
 David McComb – vocals, guitar
 Alsy MacDonald – drums, vocals
 Robert McComb – guitar, vocals, violin
 Martyn P. Casey – bass
 Jill Birt – keyboards
 Graham Lee – guitar
 Adam Peters – keyboards

References

External links
 Discogs release

1987 singles
The Triffids songs
1987 songs
Island Records singles
Songs written by David McComb
Song recordings produced by Gil Norton